The Canton of Bédarieux is a former subdivision of the French department of Hérault, and its subdivision, the Arrondissement of Béziers. It had 10,000 inhabitants (2012). It was disbanded following the French canton reorganisation which came into effect in March 2015.

Municipalities
The canton comprised the following communes:

 Bédarieux
 Camplong
 Carlencas-et-Levas
 Faugères
 Graissessac
 Pézènes-les-Mines
 Le Pradal
 Saint-Étienne-Estréchoux
 La Tour-sur-Orb

References

Bedarieux
2015 disestablishments in France
States and territories disestablished in 2015